Plaisance is a municipality in Papineau Regional County Municipality in western Quebec, Canada. The village is situated on the Ottawa River near the mouth of the Petite-Nation River, 70 km from Gatineau and 160 km from Montreal on Route 148.

The village is well known for its waterfalls located just north of town as well as a local cheese factory which was previously quite popular in the Outaouais region. There is also the Plaisance National Park, a large bird reserve between the main highway and the Ottawa River.

Demographics

Mother tongue:
 English as first language: 2.3%
 French as first language: 96.8%
 English and French as first language: 0.5%
 Other as first language: 0%

References

External links

Village web site

Municipalities in Quebec
Incorporated places in Outaouais